is an arcade collectible card game in Bandai's Data Carddass line of machines, which launched in December 2020. Unlike the Aikatsu!, Aikatsu Stars!, Aikatsu Friends! and Aikatsu on Parade! series of arcade games, it revolves around using collectible swing cards for idol battle stage.

A hybrid live-action Tokusatsu drama/anime television adaptation by BN Pictures aired from January 10 to June 27, 2021.

A sequel film, Aikatsu Planet! The Movie was released on July 15, 2022.

Plot
An ordinary first-year student at the private academy Seirei Private High School named Mao Otoha is in a place of Meisa Hinata, who suddenly disappeared, taking the avatar of Aikatsu Planet!'s top idol Hana to begin her idol activities However, Mao's new role as Hana is a secret kept from everyone else.

In the adored virtual world of "Aikatsu Planet!", real life idols can become an avatar. Mao, who assume the role as Hana, uses "Swing Card" with her chosen "Dressia" to put on a dress, and begins the world of intense Battle Stages with her rivals. Along with her best friend Shiori Motoya, model Ruli Tamaki, as well as senior Kyōko Umekōji, they aim to be top idols together.

Production
On 10 August 2020, Aikatsu Planet! was officially announced during a press conference of Bandai x BN Pictures Festival alongside its cast. The series was originally set to premiere in October 2020, but the series was delayed to January 2021 due to the COVID-19 pandemic in Japan. The series aired from January 10 to June 27, 2021.

Episodes

  

 
 

SWEET MEMORIES

Music
The anime uses two pieces of theme songs.

Insert songs
  - Meisa (Episode 1), Mao and Ruli (Episode 2), Ayumi(Episode 5), Mao and Ann (Episode 12), Mao, Ruli, Kyōko, and Shiori (Episode 12)
 Flying Tip - Ruli and Ayumi (Episode 6), Mao and Ayumi (Episode 13)
 Magical Door - Ruli and Shiori from Starry Planet (Episode 9)
  - Mao and Shiori (Episode 10), Ayumi and Kyōko (Episode 14)
 Inner Voice - Ruli and Meisa (Episode 15), Ruli and Kyōko (Episode 20)
  - Ann and Sara (Episode 17), Shiori and Sara (Episode 18)
  - Mao and Shiori

Film

A film, simply titled Aikatsu Planet! The Movie, was released in theaters in Japan on July 15, 2022.

Cast
: 
: 
: 
: 
: 
: 
: 
: 
: 
: 
: 
: 
: 
: 
: 
: 
: 
: 
: 
: 
: 
: 
: 
: 
: 
: 
: 
: 
:

Notes

References

External links
 
 
 

2021 Japanese television series debuts
2020 video games
Aikatsu!
Arcade video games
Arcade-only video games
Bandai Namco games
Bandai Namco Pictures
Japan-exclusive video games
Japanese idols in anime and manga
TV Tokyo original programming
Video games developed in Japan
Tokusatsu television series
Japanese television series with live action and animation